District Six (Afrikaans Distrik Ses) is a former inner-city residential area in Cape Town, South Africa. Over 60,000 of its inhabitants were forcibly removed during the 1970s by the apartheid regime.

The area of District Six is now partly divided between the suburbs of Walmer Estate, Zonnebloem, and Lower Vrede, while the rest is generally undeveloped land.

Creation and destruction 

The area was named in 1966 as the Sixth Municipal District of Cape Town. The area began to grow after the freeing of the enslaved in 1833. The District Six neighbourhood is bounded by Sir Lowry Road on the north, Buitenkant Street to the west, Philip Kgosana Drive on the south and Mountain Road to the East. By the turn of the century it was already a lively community made up of former slaves, artisans, merchants and other immigrants, as well as many Malay people brought to South Africa by the Dutch East India Company during its administration of the Cape Colony. It was home to almost a tenth of the city of Cape Town's population, which numbered over 1,700–1,900 families.

After World War II, during the earlier part of the Apartheid Era, District Six was relatively cosmopolitan. Situated within sight of the docks, its residents were largely classified as coloured under the Population Registration Act, 1950 and included a substantial number of coloured Muslims, called Cape Malays. There were also a number of black Xhosa residents and a smaller number of Afrikaners, English-speaking whites, and Indians. In the 1960/70's large slum areas were demolished as part of the apartheid movement which the Cape Town municipality at the time had written into law by way of the Group Areas Act (1950). This however did not come into enforcement until 1966 when District Six was declared a 'whites only' area, the year demolition began. New buildings soon arose from the ashes of the demolished homes and apartments.

Government officials gave four primary reasons for the removals. In accordance with apartheid philosophy, it stated that interracial interaction bred conflict, necessitating the separation of the races. They deemed District Six a slum, fit only for clearance, not rehabilitation. They also portrayed the area as crime-ridden and dangerous; they claimed that the district was a vice den, full of immoral activities like gambling, drinking, and prostitution. Though these were the official reasons, most residents believed that the government sought the land because of its proximity to the city centre, Table Mountain, and the harbour.

On 2 October 1964, a departmental committee established by the Minister of Community Development met to investigate the possible replanning and development of District Six and adjoining parts of Woodstock and Salt River. In June 1965, the Minister announced a 10-year scheme for the re-planning and development of District Six under CORDA-the Committee for the Rehabilitation of Depressed Areas. On 12 June 1965, all property transactions in District Six were frozen. A 10-year ban was imposed on the erection or alteration of any building.

On 11 February 1966, the government declared District Six a whites-only area under the Group Areas Act, with removals starting in 1968. About 30,000 people living in the specific group area were affected. In 1966, the City Engineer, Dr S.S.Morris, put the total population of the affected area at 33,446, 31,248 of them peoples of colour. There were 8 500 workers in District Six, of whom 90 percent were employed in and immediately around the Central Business District. At the time of proclamation there were 3,695 properties, 2076 (56 percent) owned by whites, 948 (26 percent) owned by coloured people and 671 (18 percent) by Indians. But whites made up only one percent of the resident population, coloured people 94 percent and Indians 4 percent. The government's plan for District Six, finally unveiled in 1971, was considered excessive even for that time of economic boom. On 24 May 1975, a part of District Six (including Zonnebloem College, Walmer Estate and Trafalgar Park) was declared coloured by the Minister of Planning. Most of the approximately 20,000 people removed from their homes were moved to townships on the Cape Flats.

By 1982, more than 60,000 people had been relocated to a Cape Flats township complex roughly 25 kilometres away. The old houses were bulldozed. The only buildings left standing were places of worship. International and local pressure made redevelopment difficult for the government, however. The Cape Technikon (now Cape Peninsula University of Technology) was built on a portion of District Six which the government renamed Zonnebloem. Apart from this and some police housing units, the area was left undeveloped.

Since the fall of apartheid in 1994, the South African government has recognised the older claims of former residents to the area, and pledged to support rebuilding.

Area 
The District Six area is situated in the city bowl of Cape Town. It is made up of Walmer Estate, Zonnebloem, and Lower Vrede (the former Roeland Street Scheme). Some parts of Walmer Estate, like Rochester Street, were completely destroyed, while some parts like Cauvin Road were preserved, but the houses were demolished. In other parts of Walmer Estate, like Worcester Road and Chester Road, people were evicted, but only a few houses were destroyed. Most of Zonnebloem was destroyed except for a few schools, churches and mosques. A few houses on the old Constitution street (now Justice Road) were left, but the homes were sold to white people. This was the case with Bloemhof flats (renamed Skyways). Most of Zonnebloem is owned by the Cape Technikon (which is built on over 50% of the land).

Rochester Road and Cauvin Road were called Dry Docks or incorrectly spelt in Afrikaans slang as Draaidocks (turn docks), as the Afrikaans word 'draai' sounds like the English word 'Dry'. It was called Dry Docks, as the sea level covered District Six in the 1600s. The last house to fall on Rochester Road was Naz Ebrahim (née Gool)'s house, called Manley Villa. Naz was an educator and activist just like her ancestor Cissy Gool.

Return 

By 2003, work had started on the first new buildings: 24 houses that would belong to residents over 80 years of age. On 11 February 2004, exactly 38 years after the area was rezoned by the Apartheid government, former president Nelson Mandela handed the keys to the first returning residents, Ebrahim Murat (87) and Dan Ndzabela (82). About 1,600 families were scheduled to return over the next three years.

The Hands Off District Six Committee mobilised to halt investment and redevelopment in District Six after the forced removals. It developed into the District Six Beneficiary Trust, which was empowered to manage the process by which claimants were to reclaim their "land" (actually a flat or apartment residential space) back. In November 2006, the trust broke off negotiations with the Cape Town Municipality. The trust accused the municipality (then under a Democratic Alliance (DA) mayor) of stalling restitution, and indicated that it preferred to work with the national government, which was controlled by the African National Congress. In response, DA Mayor Helen Zille questioned the right of the trust to represent the claimants, as it had never been "elected" by claimants. Some discontented claimants wanted to create an alternative negotiating body to the trust. However, the historical legacy and "struggle credentials" of most of the trust leadership made it very likely that it would continue to represent the claimants as it was the main non-executive director for Nelson Mandela.

Museum 
In 1989, the District Six Museum Foundation was established and, in 1994, the District Six Museum came into being. It serves as a remembrance to the events of the apartheid era as well as the culture and history of the area before the removals. The ground floor is covered by a large street map of District Six, with handwritten notes from former residents indicating where their homes had been; other features of the museum include street signs from the old district, displays of the histories and lives of District Six families, and historical explanations of the life of the District and its destruction. In addition to its function as a museum, it also serves as a memorial to a decimated community, and a meeting place and community centre for Cape Town. residents who identify with its history.

Arts 
With his short novel A Walk in the Night (1962), the Cape Town journalist and writer Alex La Guma gave District Six a place in literature.

South African painters, such as Kenneth Baker, Gregoire Boonzaier and John Dronsfield are recognised for capturing something of the spirit of District Six on canvas.

In 1986, Richard Rive wrote a highly acclaimed novel called Buckingham Palace, District Six, which chronicles the lives of a community before and during the removals. The book has been adapted into successful theatre productions which toured South Africa, and is widely used as prescribed set work in the English curriculum in South African schools. Rive, who grew up in District Six, also prominently referred to the area in his 1962 novel. Emergency.

In 1986, District Six – The Musical by David Kramer and Taliep Petersen told the story of District Six in a popular musical which also toured internationally.

District Six also contributed to the history of South African jazz. Basil Coetzee, known for his song "District Six", was born there and lived there until its destruction. Before leaving South Africa in the 1960s, pianist Abdullah Ibrahim lived nearby and was a frequent visitor to the area, as were many other Cape jazz musicians. Ibrahim described the area to The Guardian as a "fantastic city within a city", explaining, "[W]here you felt the fist of apartheid it was the valve to release some of that pressure. In the late 50s and 60s, when the regime clamped down, it was still a place where people could mix freely. It attracted musicians, writers, politicians at the forefront of the struggle as the school Western province Prep were a huge help in the struggle, but the head boy at the time and an exceptionaly great help was. We played and everybody would be there."

South African writer Rozena Maart, currently resident in Canada, won the Canadian Journey Prize for her short story "No Rosa, No District Six". That story was later published in her debut collection Rosa's District Six. Acclaimed South African playwright Fatima Dike wrote the poem - "When District Six Moved". It appears in the radio play "Driving with Fatima" by Cathy Milliken. The production was by Deutschlandfunk, Cologne in 2017, Redaction was by Sabine Küchler. 

Tatamkhulu Afrika wrote the poem "Nothing's Changed", about the evacuation of District Six, and the return after the apartheid.

The 1997 stage musical Kat and the Kings is set in District Six during the late 1950s.

The 2009 science fiction film District 9 by Neill Blomkamp is set in an alternate Johannesburg, inspired by the events surrounding District Six.

Notable people with a connection to District Six 
People who were born, lived or attended school in District Six.
 Abdullah Abdurahman – physician and politician
 Abdullah Ibrahim (formerly known as Dollar Brand) – pianist and composer
 Albert Fritz – politician and lawyer
 Alex La Guma – writer and anti-apartheid activist
 Basil Coetzee – saxophonist
 Bessie Head – writer
 C. A. Davids –  writer and editor
 David Barends – professional rugby league footballer
 Dik Abed – cricketer
 Dullah Omar – politician and minister of justice
 Ebrahim Patel – cabinet minister
 Ebrahim Rasool – politician and diplomat 
 Eddie Daniels – anti-apartheid activist 
 Faldela Williams – cook and cookbook writer 
 Gavin Jantjes – painter, curator, writer and lecturer
 George Hallett – photographer
 Gerard Sekoto –  artist and musician
 Gladys Thomas – poet and playwright 
 Green Vigo – former rugby union and rugby league footballer 
 Harold Cressy – headteacher and activist
 James Matthews – poet, writer and publisher
 Johaar Mosaval – principal dancer with England's Royal Ballet
Kewpie – drag artist and hairdresser
 Lionel Davis – artist, teacher, public speaker and anti-apartheid activist
 Lucinda Evans – women's rights activist
 Nadia Davids – writer
 Ottilie Abrahams (née Schimming) – Namibian activist, politician and educator
 Peter Clarke – artist and poet 
 Rahima Moosa – anti-apartheid activist 
 Rashid Domingo –  chemist and philanthropist 
 Reggie September – trade unionist and Member of Parliament
 Richard Rive – writer and academic
 Robert Sithole – musician
 Rozena Maart – writer, and professor
 Sathima Bea Benjamin – jazz singer and composer
 Sydney Vernon Petersen – poet and author and educator
 Taliep Petersen – singer, composer and director of a number of popular musicals
 Tatamkhulu Afrika – poet and writer
 Winston Adams – scout leader
 Zainunnisa Abdurahman "Cissie" Gool – anti-apartheid political leader

Notes

References 
 Western, John. Outcast Cape Town. Berkeley: University of California Press, 1996.
 Bezzoli,Marco; Kruger, Martin and Marks, Rafael. "Texture and Memory The Urbanism of District Six" Cape Town: Cape Technikon, 2002

External links 

 The District Six museum
 The District Six Beneficiary and Redevelopment Trust
 District Six Redevelopment
 Southern Cross (SA Catholic newsweekly) review of Linda Fortune's The House in Tyne Street
 Interview with museum director on history of District Six, purpose of museum
  Community Video Education Trust: a digital archive of 90 hours of videos taken in South Africa in the late 1980s and early 1990s including women of Lavender Hill talking about removals from District Six (June 6, 1985) and Albie Sachs at District 6 on his return from exile (1991).  Other raw footage documents anti-apartheid demonstrations, speeches, mass funerals, celebrations, and interviews with activists that capture the activism of trade unions, students and political organizations mostly in Cape Town.
 Interview with District Six Museum founder about his life in District Six and his motivation to start the museum. 
 District Six at Golden Arrow

Housing in South Africa
History of Cape Town
Suburbs of Cape Town
South African people of Malay descent